Django Lovett (born 6 July 1992) is a Canadian male track and field athlete who competes in the high jump. Lovett represented Canada at the 2020 Summer Olympics in Tokyo.

Life and career

Born in Surrey, British Columbia to Catherine and John Lovett, he initially played soccer before moving into the high jump, following comments by his school soccer coach that he was too slow for the sport. Lovett had success at a young age in high jump, breaking the Canadian youth record and receiving the honour of Canadian Youth Athlete of the Year in 2009. He attended Brookswood Secondary School before heading south of the border to study Arts and communications at the University of New Mexico.

He made his international debut at the 2009 World Youth Championships in Athletics, taking a bronze medal. He later competed in qualifying at the 2010 World Junior Championships in Athletics and was fifth at the 2012 NACAC Under-23 Championships in Athletics.

He competed athletically for the New Mexico Lobos team and qualified for the NCAA Championships on several occasions. He represented Canada at the 2013 Summer Universiade, though he did not progress beyond the qualifying round. He was top of the podium at the Canada Summer Games that year.

In the leadup to the 2020 Summer Olympics in Tokyo, Lovett hit the Olympic qualifying standard in his third and final attempt at 2.33 metres at the Canadian Olympic track and field trials, beating Michael Mason for the Canadian title in the process. He was thus named to the Canadian Olympic team. Competing at the Olympic high jump event, he jumped 2.30 metres to finish in eighth place.

International competitions

National titles
Canada Summer Games
High jump: 2013 (runner-up in 2009

References

External links
 

1992 births
Living people
Sportspeople from Surrey, British Columbia
Canadian male high jumpers
Commonwealth Games bronze medallists for Canada
Commonwealth Games medallists in athletics
Athletes (track and field) at the 2018 Commonwealth Games
Athletes (track and field) at the 2020 Summer Olympics
New Mexico Lobos men's track and field athletes
Canadian expatriates in the United States
Olympic track and field athletes of Canada
20th-century Canadian people
21st-century Canadian people
Medallists at the 2018 Commonwealth Games